"The Game Is Won" is a song by English singer-songwriter Lucie Silvas. It was released as the third single from her debut studio album, Breathe In (Lucie Silvas album) (2004). The song was released on 2 May 2005 and reached number 38 on the UK Singles Chart.

Track listings

Credits and personnel
Credits are lifted from the UK CD1 liner notes.

Studios
 Recorded at Studio 360
 Strings recorded at Abbey Road Studios (London, England)
 Mixed at Quad Studios (New York City)

Personnel

 Lucie Silvas – writing, vocals, background vocals, piano
 Judie Tzuke – writing
 Graham Kearns – writing, guitars
 Mike Peden – writing, production
 Mia Silvas – background vocals
 Paul Turner – bass
 Peter Gordeno – keyboards
 Charlie Russell – drums, drum programming

 Martin Hayles – recording
 Dan Gautreau – recording assistant
 Gary Thomas – recording (strings)
 Michael H. Brauer – mixing
 Keith Gary – mixing assistant, Pro Tools engineering
 Nick Ingman – string arrangement, conductor
 Gavyn Wright – concertmaster
 Isobel Griffiths – orchestra contractor

Charts

References

Lucie Silvas songs
2004 songs
2005 singles
Mercury Records singles
Songs written by Judie Tzuke
Songs written by Lucie Silvas
Songs written by Mike Peden